Dussartius baeticus is a species of crustacean in the family Diaptomidae. It is endemic to the Iberian Peninsula, having been found in south-eastern Spain, and in the waters of the Tagus estuary, the Caniçada reservoir (Cávado drainage basin), and four reservoirs in the Mondego system in Portugal.

References

Diaptomidae
Freshwater crustaceans of Europe
Monotypic arthropod genera
Taxonomy articles created by Polbot